Rakitnoye is a rural locality (a selo) in Novoalexeyevsky Selsoviet of Ivanovsky District, Amur Oblast, Russia. The population was 66 as of 2018. There are 6 streets.

Geography 
Rakitnoye is located 19 km northeast of Ivanovka (the district's administrative centre) by road. Lugovoye is the nearest rural locality.

References 

Rural localities in Ivanovsky District, Amur Oblast